Encoptolophus costalis, known generally as the western clouded grasshopper or dusky grasshopper, is a species of band-winged grasshopper in the family Acrididae.  It is found in Central America and North America.

References

Further reading

 
 

Oedipodinae